Garlic sauce is a sauce prepared using garlic as a primary ingredient. It is typically a pungent sauce, with the depth of garlic flavor determined by the amount of garlic used. The garlic is typically crushed or finely diced. Simple garlic sauce is composed of garlic and another ingredient to suspend the bulb via emulsion, such as oil, butter or mayonnaise. Various additional ingredients can be used to prepare the sauce.

Garlic sauce can be used to add flavor to many foods and dishes, such as steak, fish, seafood, mutton, chops, chicken, eggs and vegetables. It is also used as a condiment.

Types

Agliata

Agliata is a savory and pungent garlic sauce and condiment in Italian cuisine used to flavor and accompany broiled or boiled meats, fish and vegetables. It is first attested in Ancient Rome, and it remains part of the cuisine of Liguria. Porrata is a similar sauce prepared with leeks in place of garlic.

Aioli
Aioli is a Mediterranean sauce made of garlic and olive oil; in some regions other emulsifiers such as egg are used. The names mean "garlic and oil" in Catalan and Provençal. It is particularly associated with the cuisines of the Mediterranean coasts of Spain (Valencia, Catalonia, the Balearic Islands, Murcia and eastern Andalusia), France (Provence) and Italy (Liguria).

Filfil chuma 
Filfil chuma is a North African recipe from Libyan Jews that is made from sweet and hot pepper powder, heaps of ground garlic, caraway, and cumin. It is used as a dipping sauce much like in Ethiopian cuisine, as a marinade for meat, or as a base seasoning for things such as stew and sauces.

Honey garlic sauce

Honey garlic sauce is a sweet and sour sauce that tastes like a mix between honey and garlic, popular in Canada. Honey garlic is one of the many sauces put on chicken wings, ribs and other foods such as meatballs.

Mojo
In Cuban cuisine, mojo applies to any sauce that is made with garlic, olive oil or pork lard, and a citrus juice, traditionally bitter orange juice. It is commonly used to flavor the cassava tuber and is also used to marinate roast pork.  Without oregano, the sauce is typically called 'mojito' and used for dipping plantain chips and fried cassava (yuca).  To create the marinade for pork, the ingredients are bitter orange juice, garlic, oregano, cumin, and salt. Garlic is also used as an ingredient in other preparations of mojo in various cuisines.

Mujdei
Mujdei is a spicy sauce in Romanian cuisine made from garlic cloves crushed and ground into a paste, salted and mixed with water and vegetable oil. Sunflower oil is almost always used. Sour cream can be added too.

Skordalia

Skordalia is a thick puree (or sauce, dip, spread, etc.) in Greek cuisine made by combining crushed garlic with a bulky base—which may be a purée of potatoes, walnuts, almonds, or liquid-soaked stale bread—and then beating in olive oil to make a smooth emulsion. Vinegar is often added.

Ta'leya
Ta'leya is a garlic sauce in Egyptian cuisine made by frying garlic with Ghee and then adding coriander and chilli. It is used as an ingredient to add flavor to bamia and koshary.

Taratoor
It's made of Tahini, lemon juice and garlic. Taratoor is a creamy garlic sauce in Arab cuisine of the Persian Gulf and French cuisine that is a predecessor to aioli. It was first prepared in the Greater Syrian region by peasants. It was later brought to the Iberian peninsula by Phoenicians, and was also brought to the Iberian peninsula at a later time by Arabs. From there, the sauce was brought to Southern France. Taratoor has been described as "an integral part of the Arab Gulf countries' cuisines".

Tomato & Garlic sauce
Tomato & Garlic sauce is prepared using tomatoes as a main ingredient, and is used in various cuisines and dishes. In Italian cuisine, alla pizzaiola refers to a tomato and garlic sauce, which is used on pizza, pasta and meats.

Toum
Toum is a thick garlic sauce common to the Levant. It contains crushed garlic, salt, olive oil or vegetable oil, and lemon juice, traditionally crushed together using a wooden mortar and pestle.

Sweet Chili Garlic Sauce
Made throughout Southeast Asia, this uses red chilies, garlic, vinegar, sugar syrup as the main ingredients, usually combined with a thickener like cornstarch.

Tzatziki
Sauce originated in Greece  which is made of minced garlic, grated cucumbers and yoghurt. Popular especially in the Balkans. In Bulgaria called 'сух таратор', meaning dried tarator, which is nothing like the arabic taratoor.

Yogurt
A very simple garlic sauce can be made by adding crushed or minced garlic to Strained yogurt, mayonnaise or sour cream. Lemon juice, salt, pepper and herbs such as dill can be used to impart additional flavour.

Gallery

See also

 Garlic oil
 List of condiments
 List of sauces

Notes

References

External links
 

Garlic dishes
Sauces